Houhai station, formerly Nanshan Shopping Center station, is a station of Shenzhen Metro Line 2 and Line 11 . Line 2 platforms opened on 28 December 2010 and Line 11 platforms opened on 28 June 2016. It is located within the Nanshan District CBD development. It serves the population coming to nearby shopping centres as well as office buildings and it is busier and more heavily used than most other Line 2 stations.

Station layout

Exits

Trivia
 Houhai Station in Traditional Chinese is also "后海站", not "後海站".

References

External links
 Shenzhen Metro Houhai Station (Line 2) (Chinese)
 Shenzhen Metro Houhai Station (Line 2) (English)
 Shenzhen Metro Houhai Station (Line 11) (Chinese)
 Shenzhen Metro Houhai Station (Line 11) (English)

Shenzhen Metro stations
Railway stations in Guangdong
Nanshan District, Shenzhen
Railway stations in China opened in 2010